, there are 73 known disc golf courses in British Columbia on the official PDGA Course Directory. 43 of them (%) are full-size courses with 18 holes or more, and 30 of them (%) are smaller courses that feature at least 9 holes.

See also 
List of disc golf courses in Canada

Notes

References 

 
British Columbia
Disc golf courses
Disc golf courses, British Columbia